The community of Irish people in Japan is estimated to constitute 1,000–2,000 people.

Notable people

 Shane Berkery
 Matt Heafy
 Francis Brinkley
Eileen Lynn Kato
 Robert Cullen
 Lafcadio Hearn
 Colin Killoran
 Niall Killoran
 John Gunning
 Anna Tsuchiya
 Naoise Ó Baoill
 Sowelu

See also
 Ireland–Japan relations

References

European diaspora in Japan
Japan